Leslie Marshall may refer to:

 Leslie Marshall (journalist), American journalist
 Leslie Marshall (writer), American novelist, journalist and wife of politician William Weld
 Leslie Marshall (cricketer) (1894–1978), British athlete